Jász may refer to:

 Jász people
 Jász language
 Jász-Nagykun-Szolnok, a county in Hungary
 Jász-Nagykun-Szolnok (former county), a county in the historical Kingdom of Hungary
 Jászság (Jász), a historical and geographical region in Hungary
 Jász, the Hungarian name for Iaz village, Obreja Commune, Caraş-Severin County, Romania

ja:ヤース